State Trunk Highway 11 (often called Highway 11, STH-11 or WIS 11) is a state highway running east–west across southern Wisconsin. The highway connects Dubuque, Iowa with the cities of Janesville, Racine and Elkhorn. Most of the route is two-lane road with the exception of an expressway bypass of Monroe, a multilane bypass of Janesville, a section where it is concurrent with I-39 and I-90, a combined freeway/divided highway bypass of Burlington to the south, where it is partially concurrent with WI 36 and WI 83, and urban multilane highway in the greater Racine area.

Route description 
WIS 11 begins in Grant County at the freeway carrying US 61 and US 151 and concurrent with WIS 35. WIS 35 turns south to Illinois a half of a mile into the route as WIS 11 meanders to the east to Hazel Green where it picks up WIS 80 north for  before turning east again into Lafayette County while WIS 80 continues north along the county line. The highway passes through Benton and Shullsburg before reaching the WIS 23 southern terminus five miles (8 km) east of Shullsburg. WIS 11 then junctions with WIS 78 in Gratiot and passes through South Wayne two miles (3 km) west of the Green County line.

Browntown is the first community that WIS 11 passes through in Green County. WIS 11 then becomes a freeway and circles around Monroe to the north, picking up concurrency with WIS 81 east and Crossing WIS 69 and the terminus of WIS 59 while on the freeway segment. WIS 81 turns southeast toward Beloit two miles (3 km) south of Brodhead while WIS 11 passes through the city and turns east into Rock County. The highway crosses WIS 213 in Orfordville and passes through Footville before beginning its southern bypass of Janesville. The bypass crosses US 51 and then joins I-39 and I-90 for  back up north where it turns east toward US 14 and joins it concurrently - the two routes continuing east to Walworth County.

Two miles into Walworth County, US 14 turns south to Darien while WIS 11 heads east into Delavan where it meets WIS 50. the highway heads northeast to Elkhorn where it junctions with WIS 67 and the freeways of US 12 which it does not have direct access to, and I-43. WIS 11 then heads east through Spring Prairie and into Racine County at Burlington. A bypass of Burlington was completed in 2010 and WIS 11 now travels around the south side of Burlington and bypassing the downtown area. In Burlington, the highway crosses or meets WIS 36, WIS 83 and WIS 142. WIS 11 passes through Union Grove and crosses US 45 then passes over I-94, I-41, and US 41 and into the greater Racine area - crossing WIS 31 in Sturtevant and ending at WIS 32 in downtown Racine - just a half mile from the shores of Lake Michigan.

History 
The current Highway 11 is the second route to be known by that name. The first Highway 11 ran from Prairie du Sac to Gotham, then to LaCrosse, and then to Superior. The route that WIS 11 currently follows was previously designated WIS 20 from the Iowa state line to Burlington. The remaining route was not a part of the state highway system at the time.

WIS 11 previously ran through downtown Janesville. A southern bypass was constructed and opened to traffic on November 11, 2002. The former route was turned back to the city and county but not given any county route designations. The bypass consisted of a two-lane road between the western end and CTH-D, and four-lane roadway between CTH-D and the interstates. The section of WIS 11 between I-39/I-90 and US 51 was previously numbered as WIS 351.

Major intersections

Business route 

Business State Trunk Highway 11 (Bus. WIS 11) in Monroe is business route of WIS 11. It follows the former alignment of WIS 11 through the city of Monroe.

See also

References

External links

011
Transportation in Grant County, Wisconsin
Transportation in Lafayette County, Wisconsin
Transportation in Green County, Wisconsin
Transportation in Rock County, Wisconsin
Transportation in Walworth County, Wisconsin
Transportation in Racine County, Wisconsin